Two Lights can refer to one of the following:

 Two Lights (album), an album by Five for Fighting
 Cape Elizabeth Lights, a pair of lighthouse towers south of Portland, Maine also known as "Two Lights"
Two Lights State Park, a state park adjacent to the lighthouse